Women's suffrage – the right of women to vote – has been achieved at various times in countries throughout the world. In many nations, women's suffrage was granted before universal suffrage, in which cases women and men from certain socioeconomic classes or races were still unable to vote. Some countries granted suffrage to both sexes at the same time. This timeline lists years when women's suffrage was enacted. Some countries are listed more than once, as the right was extended to more women according to age, land ownership, etc. In many cases, the first voting took place in a subsequent year.

Some women in the Isle of Man (geographically part of the British Isles but not part of the United Kingdom) gained the right to vote in 1881.

New Zealand was the first self-governing country in the world in which all women had the right to vote in parliamentary elections; from 1893. However women could not stand for election to parliament until 1919, when three women stood (unsuccessfully); see 1919 in New Zealand.

The colony of South Australia allowed women to both vote and stand for election in 1894. In Sweden, conditional women's suffrage was granted during the age of liberty between 1718 and 1772. But it was not until the year 1919 that equality was achieved, where women's votes were valued the same as men's.

The Australian Commonwealth Franchise Act 1902 enabled women to vote at federal elections and also permitted women to stand for election to the Australian Parliament, making the newly-federated country of Australia the first in the modern world to do so, although some states excluded indigenous Australians. 

In 1906, the autonomous Grand Duchy of Finland, which later became the Republic of Finland, was the first country in the world to give all women and all men both the right to vote and the right to run for office. 
Finland was also the first country in Europe to give women the right to vote. 
The world's first female members of parliament were elected in Finland the following year. 

In Europe, the last jurisdiction to grant women the right to vote was the Swiss canton of Appenzell Innerrhoden (AI), in 1991; AI is the smallest Swiss canton with  14,100 inhabitants in 1990. Women in Switzerland obtained the right to vote at federal level in 1971, and at local cantonal level between 1959 and 1972, except for Appenzell in 1989/1990, see Women's suffrage in Switzerland. 

In Saudi Arabia women were first allowed to vote in December 2015 in the municipal elections.

For other women's rights, see timeline of women's legal rights (other than voting).

17th century 

1689

 : Female landowners are allowed to vote in elections to the States of Friesland in rural districts.

18th century 

1718
 : Female taxpaying members of city guilds are allowed to vote in local city elections (rescinded in 1758) and national elections (rescinded in 1772).

1734
 : Female taxpaying property owners of legal majority are allowed to vote in local countryside elections (never rescinded).

1755
 : Female suffrage in the independent republic's Diet (assembly; rescinded upon annexation by France in 1769).

1776
  (US state): later rescinded in 1807

19th century

1830s
1838

1840s
1840
 Hawaiian Kingdom: later rescinded in 1852

1848

1850s
1853

 : The Province of Vélez, in what was then the Republic of New Granada (modern day Colombia), grants universal suffrage to men and women. The Supreme Court annulled the provision for women a few years later.

1856
  following population transfer from Pitcairn.

1860s

1861
  – Australian colony of South Australia: property-owning women were given the right to vote.

1862
 : limited to local elections with votes graded after taxation; universal franchise achieved in 1919, which went into effect at the 1921 elections.
 : limited to local elections, only for literate women in San Juan Province.

1863
  The Grand Duchy of Finland: limited to taxpaying women in the countryside for municipal elections; and in 1872, extended to the cities.

1864

  – Australian colony of Victoria: women were unintentionally enfranchised by the Electoral Act (1863), and proceeded to vote in the following year's elections. The Act was amended in 1865 to correct the error.
  – Austrian Empire: limited to taxpaying women and women in "learned professions" who were allowed to vote by proxy and made eligible for election to the legislative body in 1864.

1869
 : limited to single women ratepayers for local elections under the Municipal Franchise Act.
 United States – incorporated Territory of Wyoming: full suffrage for women.

1870s

1870
 United States – Utah Territory passed a law granting women's suffrage. Utah women citizens voted in municipal elections that spring and a general election on August 1, beating Wyoming women to the polls. The women's suffrage law was later repealed as part of the Edmunds–Tucker Act in 1887.
 May 10, 1872, New York City: Equal Rights Party nominates Victoria C. Woodhull as their candidate for US President.

1880s

1881
 : Female taxpayers allowed to vote in local elections (rescinded in 1895).
  (self-governing British Crown dependency, with its own parliament and legal system) (limited at first to women "freeholders" and then, a few years later, extended to include women "householders"). Universal suffrage / the franchise for all resident men and women was introduced in 1919. All men and women (with a very few exceptions such as clergy) could also stand for election from 1919.

1884
  —Canadian province: limited to widows and spinsters to vote in municipal elections; later extended to other provinces.

1888
 : Proposed Constitutional Amendment to extend suffrage and the right to hold office to women (limited to spinsters and widows who owned property).

1889
 The municipality of  Franceville in the New Hebrides (universal suffrage within its short existence. Loses self-rule within months)

1890s

1893

 : first self-governing colony in the world in which all women are given the right to vote in parliamentary elections. However, women were barred from standing for election until 1919.
  (British protectorate) universal suffrage.
  (US state) (first state in the union to enfranchise women by popular vote)

1894
 : universal suffrage, extending the franchise from property-owning women (granted in 1861) to all women, the first colony in Australia to do so.
 : Local Government Act 1894 confirms single women's right to vote in local elections and extends this franchise to some married women. By 1900, over 1 million women were registered for local government elections in England.

1895
 : South Australian women became the first in the world to stand for election. This right had been granted the previous year in an act of the South Australian Parliament.

1896
  (US state): reestablishes women's suffrage upon gaining statehood.
  (US state)

1898
 : Danske Kvindeforeningers Valgretsforbund (Danish Women's Society's Suffrage Union) founded in Copenhagen

1899
 : the Australian colony of Western Australia

20th century

1900s

1901
   (Australian state): were allowed to vote in Australia's first federal election
   (Australian state): were allowed to vote in Australia's first federal election

1902
 : The Commonwealth Franchise Act 1902 gave women the right to vote at federal elections on the same terms as men. Women in South Australia and Western Australia had equal voting rights prior to Federation on 1 January 1901, and were guaranteed the right to vote at the first federal election by section 41 of the Constitution of Australia. Women in the other four states acquired equal voting rights with the passage of the Commonwealth Franchise Act. However this excluded indigenous Australians (both men and women) in the states of Queensland and Western Australia. The 1903 Australian federal election was the first under the new legislation.
 (Australian state)

1903
 (Australian state)

1905
 Latvia, Russian Empire
 (Australian state) (limited to non-indigenous women)

1906

  Grand Duchy of Finland (first in Europe to give women the right to vote and stand for parliament as a result of 1905 Russian Revolution). The world's first female members of parliament were elected in Finland the following year.
 : Perhaps inspired by the Franceville experiment, the Anglo-French Condominium of the New Hebrides grants women the right to vote in municipal elections and to serve on elected municipal councils. (Limited to British, French, and other colonists, and excluding indigenous women.)

1908
 (limited to local elections)
 (Australian state): last Australian state to enact equal voting rights for women in state elections.

1910s

1910
  (US state)

1911
  (US state)
 : Julieta Lanteri, doctor and leading feminist activist, votes in the election for the Buenos Aires City Legislature. She  had realized that the government did not make specifications regarding gender, and appealed to justice successfully, becoming the first South American woman to vote. 
 : Carolina Beatriz Ângelo becomes the first Portuguese woman to vote due to a legal technicality; the law is shortly thereafter altered to specify only literate male citizens over the age of 21 had the right to vote.

1912
  (US state)
  (US state)
  (US state)

1913
  (US territory)
 

1914
  (US state)
  (US state)

1915

  (including Iceland) (full voting rights)

1916
    (Canadian province)
    (Canadian province)
    (Canadian province)

1917
    (US State)
  
  
   (as an independent country)
  
     (Canadian province)
     (Canadian province)
   (limited to war widows, women serving overseas, and women with family serving overseas)
   Russian Republic
  
   (per Constitution)
  Crimean People's Republic

1918
 Banat, Bačka and Baranja Women over 20 were allowed to vote on the elections for the Great National Assembly. Seven female delegates were elected. Rescindend after incorporation into Kingdom of Serbs, Croats and Slovenes in 1922.
   (Full voting rights, The world's first democratically elected Muslim woman was from Georgia)
   (US state)
    (US state)
   (US state)
  
  
   (limited to women over 21, "not alien-born", and meeting provincially determined property qualifications)
 : First four women elected to the Folketing.
     (Canadian province)
 
   Limited to women over the age of 24 who were literate. (full suffrage granted in 1945)
   (just after regaining independence)
   (Soviet Union)
 (Soviet Union)
   (limited to women over 30; conditional on ownership of property and qualifications of their husbands. Women over 21 given the franchise in 1928)
   (limited to women over 30, compared to 21 for men and 19 for those who had fought in World War One; various property qualifications remained; see Representation of the People Act 1918.)
  The Riksdag introduces equal voting rights in city council and municipal elections.

1919

   
   (limited to voting at municipal level)
  
  : universal suffrage to trade union members only.
  : all adults could vote or be elected, widows and single women who owned property could vote from 1881.
  (British Crown Colony) Limited suffrage granted to women of twenty-five years or more, who earned £50 or more per year, or paid taxes of £2. (Universal adult suffrage not granted until 1944.)
   (voting at local/municipal level)
  
   (women gain the right to vote in an election, having been given the right to stand in elections in 1917)
   (women gain the right to stand for election into parliament; right to vote for Members of Parliament since 1893)
     (Canadian province) (limited to voting. Women's right to stand for office protected in 1934)
   (US state)
  (British Crown Colony) (women now allowed to vote and stand for election into parliament)
 South West Caucasian Republic
   The Riksdag takes the first out of two constitutional decisions for equal voting rights in elections to the Riksdag

1920s

1920
  Albania
 (the newly adopted constitution guarantees universal suffrage incl. women and the first vote to the National Assembly is held; politically, the women's suffrage is guaranteed already in the Declaration of Independence from 1918, and women vote in local elections in 1919)
 Kingdom, Princely Indian State in the British Empire. It was the first place in India to grant women's suffrage, but did not grant the right to stand in elections.
 2nd of the princely states in India to grant women enfranchisement. 
 (all remaining states by amendment to federal Constitution). In practice, this meant White women; Black persons, both women and men, were largely disenfranchised by unequal literacy tests in many states until the Civil Rights Act of 1964. 

1921
 (Soviet Union)
, Madras Presidency was the first of the provinces in the British Raj to grant women's suffrage, though there were income and property restrictions and women were not allowed to stand for office.
, Bombay Presidency became the second of the provinces in British India to grant the right for women to vote with income and property restrictions and an inability to stand in elections. 
Federal Republic of Central America (Costa Rica, El Salvador, Guatemala, and Honduras) established in the 9 September 1921 federal constitution that married or widowed literate women of 21 or more, or single literate women of 25 or more could vote or hold office as long as they met any property requirements. When the Federation fell apart the following year, women lost the right to vote.
  The Riksdag takes the second and confirming the decision to amend the Constitution such that equal voting rights are introduced in elections to the Riksdag.

1922
, Burma Province became the third province of British India to grant limited suffrage, but not the right to stand in elections.
 (equal parliamentary (Oireachtas) suffrage to that of men upon independence from UK. Partial suffrage granted as part of UK in 1918.)
 became the 3rd of India's princely estates to grant women's suffrage.
 (Canadian province)
 (Mexican state) (limited to regional and congressional elections)

1923
, United Provinces of Agra and Oudh became the 4th province in British India to grant limited suffrage, though women could not stand for office.
 Rajkot State became the first princely state and first entity in British India to grant women both the right to vote and stand in elections.

1924
, Assam Province became the 5th province in British India to grant suffrage with income and property restrictions, as well as the inability to stand for office.
 (a doctor, Matilde Hidalgo de Prócel, sues and wins the right to vote)
 (Soviet Union)
Kingdom of Cochin one of the princely states of British India granted both suffrage and the right for women to stand in elections.
 (no electoral system in place prior to this year)
 
 (limited to single women and widows in local elections. First women mayors)
 (Soviet Union)

1925
, Bengal Presidency became the 6th province in British India to grant limited suffrage without the ability for women to stand in elections.
  (limited to women 25 and older; men can vote at age 21. Equal suffrage granted in 1946.)
 (limited to local elections)

1926
, Punjab Province became the 7th province in British India to grant limited suffrage without the ability for women to stand in elections.
 was empowered by the British Parliament to amend the voting regulations and allow women to stand for office, if the province in which they resided granted women's suffrage.

1927
 Central Provinces became the 8th province in British India to grant suffrage to women.
  (Soviet Union)
 (women's suffrage is broadcast for the first time in 1927, in the plebiscite of Cerro Chato)

1928
 (franchise made equal to that for men by the Representation of the People Act 1928)

1929
 Bihar and Orissa Province became the last of the provinces in British India to grant women's limited suffrage with income and property restrictions.
 (the right of women to vote is written into the Constitution)
 (literate women given the right to vote. Equal suffrage granted in 1935.)
 (limited to local elections only, with restrictions)

1930s

1930
 (Women's Enfranchisement Act, 1930: limited to white women on the same basis as white men.)
 (limited to municipal elections).

1931
 (Modern day Sri Lanka) (Universal Suffrage)
 (limited to municipal level for female owners of real estate under Legislative Decree No. 320)
 (with unequal restrictions regarding level of education)
 (universal suffrage)

1932

 (universal suffrage)

1934
 (limited to municipal level under Law No. 5,357)

 (suffrage is expanded)
 (Mexican state) (limited to regional and congress elections only)
 (parliamentary elections; full voting rights and rights to be elected for any public office including the National Parliament, which resulted in 18 female members of the parliament to stand for office from 18 different provinces in the 1935 National Parliament elections).

1935
  
 British Burma (women are granted the right to vote)
  (equal suffrage at local elections; partial suffrage as part of the UK from 1869, extended in 1918.)

1937
 (limited to mothers with legitimate children voting in local elections)
 (for European women only)

1938

 (Soviet Union)
 (European women)

1939
 (with restrictions requiring literacy and a higher age)
 (women are granted suffrage on equal terms with men with restrictions on both men and women; in practice the restrictions affected women more than men)
 (white women)

1940s

1940
   (Canadian province)
   (Soviet Union) (as part of Romania, partial suffrage from 1929, extended in 1939)

1941
  (limited to European women only)
  (with restrictions. Full suffrage granted in 1946.)

1942
 

1944
 (limited to property-holding women)
 (full rights)

1945
 
 
  (Literate only)

 French Togoland

1946

 French Somaliland

 North Korea
 (Americo women only; indigenous men and women were not enfranchised until 1951)
  
 (expands suffrage)
 (extended to full rights)

1947

  (includes Taiwan: with restrictions)

 (limited to municipal level)
 (establishment of the state)

 (establishment of the state)

1948
 adopted The Universal Declaration of Human Rights Article 21

 (establishment of the state)

 (first ever free elections were held in 2005)

 Dutch Surinam

1949
 (right expanded to all elections on January 8 by Law No. 9,292)
 
 (establishment of the state)

1950s

1950

 (all restrictions removed)

1951

1952
 enacts Convention on the Political Rights of Women

1953

 (all women and for national elections)

1954

1955

 (as part of Ethiopia)

1956

1957
 (by constitution)

 (nationwide)

1958

 (South)

1959

  (Swiss canton)
  (Swiss canton)

1960s

1960

 (Swiss canton)

1961

1962

 (universal suffrage Australian Aboriginals men and women)

 (revoked) (including men)

1963

 (after a referendum)

1964
  

 (Territory of Papua and Territory of New Guinea)

1965

 (all restrictions removed).

1966
 (Swiss canton)

1967

 (women's vote made obligatory, like that of men's)

1968
  (Swiss canton)
 (universal)

 (systemic limitations remained due to the general rule of being able to read)

1970s

1970

1971
 (federal level)

1972
 (suffrage enshrined in constitution adopted after independence) (For pre 1971 rights see British Raj 1935 and East/West Pakistan 1947.)

1973
 (Bahrain did not hold elections until 2002)

1974

1975

1976
 Timor Timur (Indonesia)
 (general restriction to be able to read was lifted after the democratication by the Carnation Revolution)

1977

1978

 (North)

1980s

1984

1985
 (first time)

1986

1989
 (universal suffrage)

1990s
1991
 (Swiss canton) was forced to accept women's suffrage by the Federal Supreme Court of Switzerland
 (universal suffrage)

1996
  (revoked)

1997

1999

 (revoked)

21st century

2000s

2001
 (re-granted after the fall of  Taliban)

2003

2005

2006
 (UAE) (limited suffrage for both men and women).

2010s

2015
 (introduced along with right to run for municipal elections)

2020s
2021
 (restricting previous full right, allowing "temporarily" limited voting rights)
Note: In some countries, both men and women have limited suffrage. For example, in Brunei, which is a sultanate, there are no national elections, and voting exists only on local issues. In the United Arab Emirates the rulers of the seven emirates each select a proportion of voters for the Federal National Council (FNC) that together account for about 12% of Emirati citizens.

See also 
 Timeline of first women's suffrage in majority-Muslim countries
 Timeline of women's suffrage in the United States
 Timeline of women's legal rights (other than voting)
 List of the first female holders of political offices in Europe
 List of the first female members of parliament by country
 List of suffragists and suffragettes
 List of women's rights activists
 List of women pacifists and peace activists
 Women's suffrage organizations

References 

 https://web.archive.org/web/20070610120752/http://www.hist.uu.se/historikermote05/program/Politik/52_Karlsson_Sjogren.pdf
 www.iraqinationality.gov.iq/attach/iraqi_constitution.pdf

External links 

 Google Spreadsheet with map—above timeline data has been tabulated and can be viewed on a world map for any given year.

Women's suffrage
 
Timelines of women in history

es:Sufragio femenino